Parliamentary elections were held in Madagascar on 4 September 1960. They were won by the Social Democratic Party, which claimed 76 of the 127 seats in the National Assembly. Voter turnout was 77.5%.

Results

References

Elections in Madagascar
Madagascar
Parliamentary election
Malagasy parliamentary election
Election and referendum articles with incomplete results